Dawn Halfkenny is an American actress. She is best known for her role as Angela on the Bounce TV series Saints & Sinners and her roles in Tales and Atlanta.

Filmography

References

External links

Living people
American television actresses
Year of birth missing (living people)
21st-century American actresses